Normal as the Next Guy is the sixth and final studio album by the Knack, released in 2001.  It marks the fourth comeback attempt by the band after its second album, ...But the Little Girls Understand, failed to achieve the success of the band's début album.  AllMusic critic Mark Deming noted that the album finds songwriter and lead singer Doug Fieger having resolved his issues with women, but has not "found a subject that appears to compel him nearly as much as the treacheries of girls once did."  Therefore, Deming feels that compared to older songs by the band, the songs on Normal as the Next Guy "may be more pleasant, but they're not as interesting."  The Rolling Stone Album Guide gave the album a 3 star rating, as high as the group's début Get The Knack, and higher than any other Knack studio album.

Normal as the Next Guy was the Knack's first release on Smile Records.  Pat Torpey and David Henderson play drums on Normal as the Next Guy, instead of original Knack drummer Bruce Gary.  Fieger has described the album as "us doing whatever we want."

Track listing
 "Les Girls" (Doug Fieger) - 3:21
 "Disillusion Town" (Berton Averre, Doug Fieger) - 4:14
 "Girl I Never Lied to You" (Monty Byrom, John Corey) - 3:35
 "Normal as the Next Guy" (Berton Averre, Doug Fieger) - 3:21
 "Spiritual Pursuit" (Doug Fieger) - 2:17
 "It's Not Me" (John Bossman, Doug Fieger) - 2:57
 "One Day at a Time" (Berton Averre, Doug Fieger) - 4:46
 "Seven Days of Heaven" (Doug Fieger, Hannah Mancini, Sergej Pobegaijlo) - 4:45
 "Dance of Romance" (Berton Averre, Doug Fieger) - 3:35
 "Reason to Live" (John Bossman, Doug Fieger) - 4:20
 "A World of My Own" (John Bossman, Doug Fieger) - 4:15
 "The Man on the Beach" (Berton Averre) - 4:14

Personnel
 Doug Fieger — lead and backing vocals, electric and acoustic guitars, bass, Mellotron, Vox organ, percussion
 Berton Averre — lead guitar, backing vocals, piano, Wurlitzer electric piano, Hammond organ, Mellotron, synth horns
 Prescott Niles — bass, six-string bass
 David Henderson — drums
 Pat Thorpey — drums

 John Amato — saxophone (track 1)
 Art Fein — accordion (track 1)
 John Jorgenson — guitar solo (track 11)
 Justin Rocherolle — percussion (track 12)

References

The Knack albums
2001 albums
Smile Records (United States) albums